Papillon (5 June 1991 – 3 April 2017) was an Irish racehorse formerly trained at Greenhills stables, in Kill, County Kildare.  His most notable success was winning the 2000 Grand National.

Papillon was owned by American Mrs Betty Moran, owner of Brushwood Stable.  She was not a fan of the Grand National and it took considerable persuasion before she would allow Papillon to be entered for the race in 2000.

Papillon had started the day with odds of 33–1 but was backed down to 10-1 by the time the race began. He was a first ever ride in the race for 20-year-old jockey Ruby Walsh, and was trained by Ruby's father Ted Walsh. When Papillon crossed the finishing line to win the world's richest steeplechase he became an instant punters' favourite.  Papillon previously came a very close second in the 1998 Irish Grand National to Bobbyjo under top-weight.

In 2001 Papillon returned to Aintree to attempt to defend his winning record.  However, conditions were completely different from the previous year, as the race was run on very heavy ground and Papillon carried more weight.  He was brought down at the 19th fence but Ruby Walsh realised there would be very few completions and remounted the horse to finish last of the four finishers, earning £25,000 for doing so.

Papillon was retired at the end of the 2002/03 season, having earned his connections over £400,000 in win and place prize money.

Papillon died on 3 May 2017, aged 26.

Grand National record

Pedigree

References

1991 racehorse births
2017 racehorse deaths
Grand National winners
National Hunt racehorses
Racehorses bred in Ireland
Racehorses trained in Ireland
Thoroughbred family 2-t